Teemu Normio (born May 9, 1980) is a Finnish professional ice hockey player who is currently playing for Frederikshavn White Hawks in the AL-Bank Ligaen.

Career statistics

External links

1980 births
Ässät players
Finnish ice hockey left wingers
Frederikshavn White Hawks players
KalPa players
Kokkolan Hermes players
Living people
Lukko players
Oulun Kärpät players
Tappara players
Ice hockey people from Tampere